The Adventure Way is an Australian outback route between Brisbane, Queensland and Innamincka, South Australia (and, in some publications, extending through to Adelaide via the Strzelecki Track). The recommended journey time, allowing for some sightseeing, food and rest (including overnight stops) is 96 hours. It has been designated by the Queensland Government as a State Strategic Touring Route.

The route 
The route commences in Brisbane, via the Ipswich Motorway and then via the Warrego Highway to Toowoomba and Dalby. From Dalby, it follows the Moonie Highway to St George. From there it follows the Balonne Highway to Cunnamulla. From Cunnamulla, the route follows the Bulloo  Developmental Road to Thargomindah. From Thargomindah, it follows the Buloo Developmental Road (Bundeena Road) to the turnoff to the Innamincka Road through to Innamincka.

The route is a sealed road through Queensland but unsealed in South Australia.

References

State Strategic Touring Routes in Queensland
Roads in South Australia